Andrea Scrugli (born 25 July 1992) is an Italian footballer.

Biography
Born in Tropea, Calabria, Scrugli spent 5 seasons with 5 different Lega Pro clubs, namely Benevento, Prato, Andria and L'Aquila from the Prime Division and Vibonese from the Second Division, from 2009 to 2014.

Scrugli had played 10 times for Prato, including once in the cup. Scrugli played his last match for Prato in 2012 pre-season friendly.

Pescara
On 2 July 2014 he was signed by fellow Abruzzese club Pescara, from L'Aquila on a free transfer. Scrugli made his official debut for Pescara in 2014–15 Coppa Italia, against Renate. In the next match Fabrizio Grillo became the starting left back. Circa September 2014 Scrugli was re-signed by L'Aquila in a temporary deal. Scrugli wore no.25 shirt and 19 shirt respectively in 2014–15 and 2015–16 season.

Akragas
On 20 August 2015 Scrugli was signed by Lega Pro newcomer Akragas from the Serie B side Pescara.

Trapani
On 5 September 2018, he signed with Serie C club Trapani on a one-year contract.

Triestina
On 14 July 2019, he joined Triestina, signing a one-year contract with an additional one-year extension option.

Sambenedettese
On 27 August 2020, he moved to Sambenedettese.

References

External links
 AIC profile (data by football.it) 

Italian footballers
U.S. Vibonese Calcio players
Benevento Calcio players
A.C. Prato players
S.S. Fidelis Andria 1928 players
L'Aquila Calcio 1927 players
Delfino Pescara 1936 players
Trapani Calcio players
U.S. Triestina Calcio 1918 players
A.S. Sambenedettese players
Serie C players
Association football defenders
Sportspeople from the Province of Vibo Valentia
Footballers from Calabria
1991 births
Living people